Devorah Blachor is an American writer, journalist, humorist and essayist who was born in New York.

Blachor wrote the ‘Coming to America’ parenting column for The New York Times Motherlode and also writes for The Washington Post, The Huffington Post, McSweeney’s, U.S. News & World Report, The Hairpin, Redbook, Good Housekeeping and The Rumpus. Her Motherlode article "Turn Your Princess-Obsessed Toddler into a Feminist in Eight Easy Steps" went viral in 2014 and was the basis for The Feminist's Guide to Raising a Little Princess: How to Raise a Little Girl Who's Authentic, Joyful and Fearless-Even if She Refuses to Wear Anything But a Pink Tutu. Kirkus Reviews wrote of The Feminist's Guide to Raising a Little Princess: "Humor abounds in this semicheeky examination of the pink world of princesses and little girls."  Her McSweeney's satire I Don't Hate Women Candidates-I Just Hated Hillary and Coincidentally I'm Starting to Hate Elizabeth Warren appeared in early 2019. Blachor adopted the voice of a male voter which Heidi Stevens in the Chicago Tribune described as "rings laugh-so-you-don’t-cry true".

Raised in an Orthodox Jewish community, Blachor is married to the Welsh novelist Matt Rees. and lives in Luxembourg.

Publishing history

 The Feminist's Guide to Raising a Little Princess: How to Raise a Little Girl Who's Authentic, Joyful and Fearless-Even if She Refuses to Wear Anything But a Pink Tutu (Penguin Tarcher, 2017)

References

External links

Collected humor articles on McSweeney's Internet Tendency
Collected posts on The New York Times Motherlode parenting blog

Living people
Year of birth missing (living people)
Writers from New York (state)
American humorists
21st-century American essayists
American columnists
Women humorists
American women essayists
The New York Times columnists
American women columnists
American Jews
21st-century American women writers